Francisco Figueredo Caballero (12 August 1960 – 14 October 2019) was a Paraguayan middle-distance runner. He competed in the men's 800 metres at the 1984 Summer Olympics. He died after being struck by a truck in 2019.

References

1960 births
2019 deaths
Athletes (track and field) at the 1984 Summer Olympics
Paraguayan male middle-distance runners
Olympic athletes of Paraguay
Athletes (track and field) at the 1987 Pan American Games
Pan American Games competitors for Paraguay
Place of birth missing
Road incident deaths in Paraguay